Pulsion Technology is software company located in Glasgow, Scotland. The company develops mobile software products in the facilities management, data collection, inspection and legionella compliance markets as well as undertaking custom software and web development.

History
Pulsion Technology was formed in 1995 by John McGuire, who is also a co-founder of WeeWorld. In 2006 the company appeared on Deloitte's Fast 500 list for EMAE companies.

In 2009 the company's eSquiggles product was part of the winning solution in the i-FM e-business awards.

Products
Pulsion Technology has two enterprise mobile products: 
 eSquiggles a mobile forms, data collection and inspection system for Windows Mobile 6.5, iPhone and Android.
 Konformance Legionella Control a system which allows legionella control and monitoring regimes to be automated replacing logbooks with electronic logbook. The system allows users to comply with standards such as AcOP L8.

References

Additional sources
 Finger on the Pulsion; John McGuire is a man in his element. Darran Gardner talks to the e-commerce revolutionary whose firm Pulsion Technology is behind the ultimate net accessory 
 Dedicated to obtaining a fairer share price 
 Excuse me, fancy a text message?; New twist to dating game as dot.com lets lonely hearts meet by phone 
 Saw-you.com developing online chat-up business - Scotland on Sunday (Edinburgh, Scotland) | HighBeam Research

External links
 Official website
 Konformance Legionella Control
 eSquiggles

Companies based in Glasgow
Software companies of the United Kingdom
Service companies of Scotland
1995 establishments in Scotland
Software companies established in 1995